Alison Mosely (born 17 August 1972 in Warwick, Queensland)	 is a wheelchair basketball player from Australia.  She was part of the silver medal-winning Australia women's national wheelchair basketball team at the 2004 Summer Paralympics. She was part of the silver medal-winning Australia women's national wheelchair basketball team at the 2000 Summer Paralympics.

References

Paralympic wheelchair basketball players of Australia
Paralympic silver medalists for Australia
Wheelchair category Paralympic competitors
Wheelchair basketball players at the 2004 Summer Paralympics
Wheelchair basketball players at the 2000 Summer Paralympics
Living people
Medalists at the 2000 Summer Paralympics
Medalists at the 2004 Summer Paralympics
1972 births
Paralympic medalists in wheelchair basketball
People from Warwick, Queensland